Coyote Buttes is a section of the Paria Canyon-Vermilion Cliffs Wilderness managed by the Bureau of Land Management (BLM), spanning extreme south-central Utah and north-central Arizona, south of US 89 halfway between Kanab, Utah and Page, Arizona. 
It is divided into two areas: Coyote Buttes North and Coyote Buttes South. 
Visiting either of the Coyote Buttes areas requires purchasing a hiking permit.

The Coyote Buttes area is an exposure of cross-bedded aeolian Jurassic Navajo Sandstone. The variable coloration of the sandstones is a result of various iron oxide pigments within the layers. A dinosaur trackway or trample surface is found in the area and provides evidence of a variety of dinosaurs. The area includes dramatic swirling erosional rock formations such as The Wave.

The Wave and Buckskin Gulch share the Wire Pass Trailhead on House Rock Valley Road.

Dinosaur trackway
The dinosaur trackway within the area is a site of  that has densely packed dinosaur footprints within the area. The trackway contains more than 1,000 footprints which were made approximately 190 million years ago. Tracks of three genera of Eubrontes, Anchisauripus and Grallator are present along with a Sauropodomorph that has not been identified.

Gallery

References

External links

 
 , with information on hiking permits
 

Buttes of Arizona
Buttes of the United States
Mountains of Utah
Rock formations of Utah
Rock formations of Arizona
Landforms of Coconino County, Arizona
Landforms of Kane County, Utah
Sandstone in the United States
Jurassic Arizona
Jurassic geology of Utah
Kanab, Utah
Colorado Plateau
Bureau of Land Management areas in Arizona
Bureau of Land Management areas in Utah
Protected areas of Coconino County, Arizona
Protected areas of Kane County, Utah